A rake (Old English raca, cognate with Dutch hark, German Rechen, from the root meaning "to scrape together", "heap up") is a broom for outside use; a horticultural implement consisting of a toothed bar fixed transversely to a handle, or tines fixed to a handle, and used to collect leaves, hay, grass, etc., and in gardening, for loosening the soil, light weeding and levelling, removing dead grass from lawns, and generally for purposes performed in agriculture by the harrow.

Large mechanized versions of rakes are used in farming, called hay rakes, are built in many different forms (e.g. star-wheel rakes, rotary rakes, etc.). Nonmechanized farming may be done with various forms of a hand rake.

Types of rakes 
Modern hand-rakes usually have steel, plastic, or bamboo teeth or tines, though historically they have been made with wood or iron. The handle is typically a ~ haft made of wood, bamboo, steel or fiberglass.

Leaf rakes, used like a broom to gather leaves, cut grass and debris, have long, flat teeth bent into an L-shape and fanned out from the point of attachment. This permits some flexibility to allow the teeth to conform to terrain, while also being light to minimise damage to vegetation. Compact, telescoping leaf rakes allow the teeth to be withdrawn by sliding a movable fixture point up the shaft.

Garden rakes typically have steel teeth and are intended for heavier use in soil and larger debris. They have long, stiff teeth which must be able to withstand abrasion and bending forces.

Bow rakes are a subset of garden rakes which separate the handle and bar with a bow-shaped extension which allows the flat back of the bar to be used for levelling and scraping. These may have somewhat finer and shorter teeth and can perform a myriad of gardening and landscape tasks, and due to their more costly construction are likely to be a professional tool. Alternatively, a second set of differently shaped teeth may be added to the back of the bar.

Cultural associations
If a rake lies in the ground with the teeth facing upwards, as shown on the top picture, and someone accidentally steps on the teeth, the rake's handle can swing rapidly upwards, colliding with the victim's face. This is often seen in slapstick comedy and cartoons, such as Tom and Jerry and The Simpsons episode "Cape Feare", wherein a series of rakes become what Sideshow Bob describes as his "arch-nemesis".

There is a Russian saying "to step on the same rake", which means "to repeat the same silly mistake", also the word "rake" in Russian slang means "troubles".

In the 16th century Chinese novel Journey to the West, the major character Zhu Bajie wields a rake as his signatory weapon.

Heavy rake
This type of rake is for conditioning and dethatching soil as well as moving larger pieces of debris. Most weeds have weaker and shallower roots than grass and thus dethatching along with (afterward) necessary sunlight, fertilizer and seed, and if later necessary any remedial chemicals, makes for a good crop of grass. Larger tools (or lawnmower attachments) are more often used for large areas of de-thatching or soil preparation. However the action of making the soil bare and exposed to sun is not good. It should be protected with straw afterward. Soil aeration tools do not remove weed but prepare soil without exposure.

Plastic or metal
There are pros and cons to each. Plastic rakes are generally lighter weight and lower cost. Because they can be fabricated in widths of greater dimensions they are more suitable for leaves which have recently been deposited. Metal tined rakes are better suited for spring raking when the debris is often wet or rotted and can best be collected when the metal tines penetrate to the thatch layer.

See also
 Aeration
 Soil

References

External links 

Gardening tools
Chinese inventions
Heraldic charges